Maddy Rosenberg is an American artist from Brooklyn, New York. She received a BFA from Cornell University and her MFA from Bard College. Rosenberg is both an artist and a curator.

Her art practice extends over a number of media, including oil painting, artist's books, printmaking, drawing, toy theater and installation and has been said to be influenced by American painter Gillian Pederson-Krag. Rosenberg's paintings and artist books are distinctive for their attention to detail, and ability to transport the viewer to imagined worlds. Her work reflects her fascination with architecture and cultural history. In the studio, Rosenberg says, she "removes the images from their original context and reassembles them to create a world of my own."

Rosenberg approaches curating as an extension of her creative practice and has facilitated and participated in international exchange exhibitions between New York and European artists. She spends several months each year living and working internationally, understanding the necessity of exploring new places to broaden her research and influences.

She also has experience as an educator, teaching at Marymount Manhattan College and at the Manhattan Graphics Center for over ten years.

Exhibitions 
Her work has been exhibited in venues around the globe and are part of prestigious public collections. For example, her solo exhibition at Galerie Hadorn in Switzerland and her residency and exhibition as the American participant in a joint Turkish/German project sponsored by the US Consulate in Munich. As well as numerous group exhibitions at the National Museum of Women in the Arts; The Brooklyn Museum; Philadelphia Athenaeum; Cape Cod Museum of Art; The Center for Book Arts; Flux Factory, and Kentler International Drawing Space in the U.S; Médiathèque André Malraux in Strasbourg; Eagle Gallery in London; and Herzog August Bibliothek in Wolfenbüttel. Rosenberg has been awarded grants from the Gottlieb Foundation, and Artists Fellowship and attended residencies at Fundación Valparaiso, Guest Atelier Salzburger Künstlerhaus, Schloss Neuhaus, Blue Mountain Center and Virginia Center for the Arts.

Curatorial career 
Rosenberg has an active exhibition and freelance curatorial career and is the founder and director of CENTRAL BOOKING in DUMBO. Since in 2009, CENTRAL BOOKING focuses on artist’s books and the overlap of art and science, particularly in regards to environmental and social justice issues, through non-traditional galleries and exhibition programs. Over 50 artist members are highlighted on their website and online store, as well as maintaining a private `library` space in Brooklyn, by appointment, where they house close to 1000 artist’s books by more than 100 international book artists. The CENTRAL BOOKING exhibition project Plant Cure and Plant Cure-Brooklyn featured the work of Artists in Residence at the New York Academy of Medicine and Brooklyn Botanic Garden, along with other artists working with the theme of medicinal plants. They received funding with grants from Creative Engagement /Lower Manhattan Cultural Council and the Brooklyn Arts Fund /Brooklyn Arts Council programs from the NYC Department of Cultural Affairs.

Collections 

 The Crouch Fine Arts Library at Baylor University has 17 pieces of Rosenberg's work, including Haunted Spaces, which includes 24 puzzle pieces in 3 suede bags, and Reptiles, composed of a lithographic accordion book. The Baylor Book Arts Collection began with the acquisition of Rosenberg's artist books.
 Cornell University Library's Division of Rare and Manuscript Collections has Rosenberg's work Dystopia and Shadow of descent, both three-dimensional pop up books.
 Other public collections include Brooklyn Museum, Baltic Centre for Contemporary Art, Fogg Museum, MoMA, National Museum of Women in the Arts, Salzburg Museum, Tate Gallery, Victoria and Albert Museum, Scottish National Gallery of Modern Art, Biblioteca Nacional de España, Duchess Anna Amalia Library, Herzog August Bibliothek, New York Public Library, Staatsbibliothek zu Berlin, London College of Communications, Yale University, and many others.

See also 

 List of book arts centers

Notes and references

External links 
 
 CENTRAL BOOKING

Living people
People from Brooklyn
Cornell University College of Architecture, Art, and Planning alumni
Bard College alumni
American contemporary painters
Painters from New York City
American multimedia artists
American art curators
Book artists
American women painters
21st-century American painters
21st-century American women artists
1956 births